Sean McMonagle (born 19 January 1988) is a Canadian-born Italian ice hockey player who most recently played for the Cardiff Devils in the Elite Ice Hockey League (EIHL) and the Italian national team.

He represented Italy at the 2019 IIHF World Championship.

References

External links

1988 births
Living people
HC Alleghe players
Bolzano HC players
Brown Bears men's ice hockey players
Dornbirn Bulldogs players
Expatriate ice hockey players in Germany
Frisk Asker Ishockey players
Ice hockey people from Ontario
Italian people of Canadian descent
Italian ice hockey defencemen
Las Vegas Wranglers players
Orli Znojmo players
Sportspeople from Oakville, Ontario
Rote Teufel Bad Nauheim players
Cardiff Devils players
Tingsryds AIF players
Italian expatriate ice hockey people
Canadian expatriate ice hockey players in Germany
Canadian expatriate ice hockey players in the United States
Canadian expatriate ice hockey players in Wales
Canadian expatriate ice hockey players in the Czech Republic
Canadian expatriate ice hockey players in Sweden
Canadian expatriate ice hockey players in Austria
Canadian expatriate ice hockey players in Norway
Italian expatriate sportspeople in Norway
Italian expatriate sportspeople in Austria
Italian expatriate sportspeople in Wales
Italian expatriate sportspeople in Germany
Italian expatriate sportspeople in Sweden
Italian expatriate sportspeople in the United States
Italian expatriate sportspeople in the Czech Republic